Coed Nant Menascin is a Site of Special Scientific Interest (SSSI), around the Nant Menasgin, near Llanfrynach in the Brecon Beacons National Park, Powys, Wales.

The Cwm Oergwm Nature Reserve of the Brecknock Wildlife Trust forms a large part of the site.

The site comprises semi-natural woodland in the steep wooded valley of the Nant Menascin (Menasgin), on the north-east slopes of the Brecon Beacons. The woodland supports a wide variety of higher and lower plants.

Access is restricted, except for the public footpaths that cross the site.

References

See also
List of Sites of Special Scientific Interest in Brecknock

Sites of Special Scientific Interest in Brecknock
Brecon Beacons